Owen Wade (1831 – 1902) was an American politician and who served as a member of the Oregon Legislature and California State Assembly.

Early life and education 
Wade was born on October 28, 1831 in Morgan County, Ohio, where he lived with his parents on a farm. In 1852, he relocated to the Willamette Valley in Oregon.

Career 
Wade was elected to the Oregon Legislature in 1862, serving until 1865. In 1865, he was appointed Registrar of General Land Office in Oregon City, Oregon by President Abraham Lincoln. In 1872, he served as chairman of the Republican Central Committee for Clackamas County. He retained the position of registrar until his resignation in January 1878. In 1879, he went to California and settled in St. Helena, California. There, in 1883, he became a cashier at the Bank of St. Helena. In 1892, he was elected to the California State Assembly. He was re-elected in 1894 and again in 1898.

Personal life 
He married Charlotte Johnson in Clackamas County, Oregon, in 1866. They had three children. Charlotte died shortly after the birth of their last daughter in 1873. He died in San Francisco on May 18, 1902.

References

External links

1902 deaths
1831 births
Republican Party members of the California State Assembly
Republican Party members of the Oregon House of Representatives
Oregon pioneers
People from Oregon City, Oregon
People from Morgan County, Ohio
People from St. Helena, California
19th-century American politicians